Viação Aérea Bahiana was a Brazilian airline founded in 1945. It ceased operations on November 4, 1948.

History
Viação Aérea Bahiana was founded on December 12, 1945 and flights started in February 1946. Panair do Brasil gave technical and administrative support for start-up but business was not successful and on November 4, 1948 it ceased operations.

Destinations
Viação Aérea Bahiana served the following cities:
Aracaju – Santa Maria Airport
Campina Grande
Ilhéus – Ilhéus Airport
João Pessoa
Maceió
Penedo
Recife
Salvador da Bahia – 2 de Julho International Airport

Fleet

See also

List of defunct airlines of Brazil

References

External links

Defunct airlines of Brazil
Airlines established in 1945
Airlines disestablished in 1948
Companies based in Bahia